Paulo e Virginia is a 1924 Brazilian silent drama film directed by Francisco de Almeida Fleming. It is based on a novel by Jacques-Henri Bernardin de Saint-Pierre.

The film premiered in Rio de Janeiro on 12 August 1924.

Cast
Lima Campos   
Rosalita de Oliveira   
Francisco de Almeida Fleming   
Gerônimo Magalhães   
Paulo Rosanova

External links
 

1924 drama films
1924 films
Brazilian black-and-white films
Brazilian silent films
Brazilian drama films
Silent drama films